The United States men's artistic gymnastics team represents the United States in FIG international competitions.

History 
The first national team roster was established in 1998. The team has competed at the Olympic Games 21 times, winning six medals.

Selection 
Gymnasts can be selected for the national team at the National Championships or the Winter Cup challenge. The Men's Program Committee (MPC) is allowed to change the criteria for selection every year.

Current roster

Senior team 
:

Senior development team 
:

Junior team 
:

Team competition results

Olympic Games 
 1908 — did not participate
 1912 — did not participate
 1920 — did not participate
 1924 — 5th place
 1928 — 7th place
 1932 —  silver medal
 1936 — 10th place
 1948 — 7th place
 1952 — 8th place
 1956 — 6th place
 1960 — 5th place
 1964 — 7th place
 1968 — 7th place
 1972 — 10th place
 1976 — 7th place
 1980 — did not participate due to boycott
 1984 —  gold medal
Peter Vidmar, Bart Conner, Mitch Gaylord, Tim Daggett, Jim Hartung, Scott Johnson
 1988 — 11th place
 1992 — 6th place
 1996 — 5th place
John Roethlisberger, Blaine Wilson, John Macready, Jair Lynch, Kip Simons, Chainey Umphrey, Mihal Bagiu
 2000 — 5th place
Blaine Wilson, Paul Hamm, Stephen McCain, John Roethlisberger, Sean Townsend, Morgan Hamm
 2004 —  silver medal
Jason Gatson, Morgan Hamm, Paul Hamm, Brett McClure, Blaine Wilson, Guard Young
 2008 —  bronze medal
Alexander Artemev, Raj Bhavsar, Joseph Hagerty, Jonathan Horton, Justin Spring, Kai Wen Tan
 2012 — 5th place
Jacob Dalton, Jonathan Horton, Danell Leyva, Sam Mikulak, John Orozco
 2016 — 5th place
Chris Brooks, Jacob Dalton, Danell Leyva, Sam Mikulak, Alexander Naddour
 2020 — 5th place
Brody Malone, Sam Mikulak, Yul Moldauer, Shane Wiskus

World Championships 

 2001 —  silver medal
Paul Hamm, Brett McClure, Sean Townsend, Raj Bhavsar, Stephen McCain, Guard Young
 2003 —  silver medal
Paul Hamm, Blaine Wilson, Jason Gatson, Morgan Hamm, Brett McClure, Raj Bhavsar
 2006 — 13th place
Guillermo Alvarez, Alexander Artemev, Jonathan Horton, David Sender, Clay Strother, Kevin Tan
 2007 — 4th place
Jonathan Horton, Alexander Artemev, Sean Golden, Kai Wen Tan, Guillermo Alvarez, David Durante
 2010 — 4th place
Chris Brooks, Chris Cameron, Jonathan Horton, Steven Legendre, Danell Leyva, Brandon Wynn
 2011 —  bronze medal
Jake Dalton, Jonathan Horton, Danell Leyva, Steven Legendre, Alexander Naddour, John Orozco
 2014 —  bronze medal
Jake Dalton, Danell Leyva, Sam Mikulak, Alexander Naddour, John Orozco, Donnell Whittenburg 
 2015 — 5th place
Chris Brooks, Danell Leyva, Alexander Naddour, Paul Ruggeri, Donnell Whittenburg, Brandon Wynn
 2018 — 4th place
Sam Mikulak, Akash Modi, Yul Moldauer, Colin Van Wicklen, Alec Yoder
 2019 — 4th place
Trevor Howard, Sam Mikulak, Akash Modi, Yul Moldauer, Shane Wiskus
 2022 — 5th place
 Asher Hong, Brody Malone, Stephen Nedoroscik, Colt Walker, Donnell Whittenburg, Yul Moldauer

Most decorated gymnasts
This list includes all American male artistic gymnasts who have won at least three medals at the Olympic Games and the World Artistic Gymnastics Championships combined.

Best international results

See also
 United States women's national gymnastics team
 List of Olympic male artistic gymnasts for the United States
 United States at the World Artistic Gymnastics Championships

References 

National men's artistic gymnastics teams
Gymnastics
Men's gymnastics teams in the United States
Gymnastics in the United States